Gazimursky Zavod is a rural locality (a selo) and the administrative center of Gazimuro-Zavodsky District of Zabaykalsky Krai, Russia, located on the right bank of the Gazimur River about  southeast of Chita. Population:

Geography

Gazimursky Zavod stands on the right bank of the Gazimur River, which is a left tributary of the Argun.

History
In 1773, silver and lead were found close to the village of Tayna. A small smelter was built in 1774–1778 and a settlement grew around it. In 1779, it became a seat of a volost. Destroyed by high waters, it was rebuilt and extended in 1789–1790.

Their leader Yegor Barbot de Marny (1743–1796) even planned to transfer the management of all Southeast Transbaikalia's extensive mining region here from Nerchinsky Zavod, where the ore was exhausted. Since the expectations at Gazimursky Zavod were also not fulfilled, the plan did not succeed.

The plant was expanded yet again in 1832—in 1834 there were 330 workers, including many exiles. However, in 1846 the smelter was closed. In 1837, there were 141 households in Gazimursky Zavod, but by 1860 their number declined to 109.

In 1851, the first staff of the First Infantry Brigade of the Trans-Baikal Cossacks troops was in Gazimursky Zavod. A hospital was established, which was open also for the civilian population. From 1872 to 1918, the Third Infantry division was stationed there.

On January 4, 1926, Gazimursky Zavod became the administrative center of its eponymous district. In 1934, a Machine and Tractor Station was established in the selo. In 1961, thirteen kolkhozes in the raion were consolidated into two sovkhozes. The administration of one of the sovkhozes was in Gazimursky Zavod.

Economy
Today Gazimursky Zavod is mainly a center of agriculture and forestry. It also houses most utilities of the district.

Transportation
Gazimursky Zavod is on the regional road R429 which connects it to Sretensk  to the northwest. Sretensk is also the nearest railway station, the terminus of a branch line of the Trans-Siberian Railway. Another road from Gazimursky Zavod leads to villages downstream the Gazimur River.

Since the 1970s, there was an air connection to Chita, but it came to a halt in the 1990s. The small airfield was closed in 2001.

In 2007, Norilsk Nickel and the Russian Railways signed an agreement to build a  railway Naryn–Lugokan, branching the Krasnokamensk railway, primarily focused on the transportation of significant molybdenum, antimony, copper, gold, and other ore deposits in the region.

Demographics
In recent decades, the population was almost constant, whereas the population declined in many places of Transbaikalia.

1959: 2,929
1989 Census: 2,497
2002 Census: 2,465
2010 Census: 2,657

Culture
There is a museum of local lore, founded in 1962, in Gazimursky Zavod. Other facilities include a cultural center and a library.

See also
 Shiwei, Inner Mongolia, on the Chinese side of the nearby Friendship Bridge

References

Notes

Sources

Rural localities in Zabaykalsky Krai